Deception Pass is a strait separating Whidbey Island from Fidalgo Island, in the northwest part of the U.S. state of Washington. It connects Skagit Bay, part of Puget Sound, with the Strait of Juan de Fuca. A pair of bridges known collectively as Deception Pass Bridge cross Deception Pass. The bridges were added to the National Register of Historic Places in 1982.

History

The Deception Pass area has been home to various Coast Salish tribes for thousands of years. The first Europeans to see Deception Pass were members of the 1790 expedition of Manuel Quimper on the Princesa Real. The Spanish gave it the name Boca de Flon. 

A group of sailors led by Joseph Whidbey, part of the Vancouver Expedition, found and mapped Deception Pass on June 7, 1792. George Vancouver gave it the name "Deception" because it had misled him into thinking Whidbey Island was a peninsula. The "deception" was heightened due to Whidbey's failure to find the strait at first. In May 1792, Vancouver was anchored near the southern end of Whidbey Island. He sent Joseph Whidbey to explore the waters east of Whidbey Island, now known as Saratoga Passage, using small boats. Whidbey reached the northern end of Saratoga Passage and explored eastward into Skagit Bay, which is shallow and difficult to navigate. He returned south to rejoin Vancouver without having found Deception Pass. It appeared that Skagit Bay was a dead-end and that Whidbey Island and Fidalgo Island were a long peninsula attached to the mainland. In June, the expedition sailed north along the west coast of Whidbey Island. Vancouver sent Joseph Whidbey to explore inlets leading to the east. The first inlet turned out to be a "very narrow and intricate channel, which...abounded with rocks above and beneath the surface of the water". This channel led to Skagit Bay, thus separating Whidbey Island from the mainland. Vancouver apparently felt he and Joseph Whidbey had been deceived by the tricky strait. Vancouver wrote of Whidbey's efforts: "This determined [the shore they had been exploring] to be an island, which, in consequence of Mr. Whidbey’s circumnavigation, I distinguished by the name of Whidbey’s Island: and this northern pass, leading into [Skagit Bay], Deception Passage".

In the waters of Deception Pass, just east of the present-day Deception Pass Bridge, is a small island known as Ben Ure Island. The island became infamous for its activity of human smuggling of migrant Chinese people for local labor. Ben Ure and his partner Lawrence "Pirate" Kelly were quite profitable at their human smuggling business and played hide-and-seek with the United States Customs Department for years. Ure's own operation at Deception Pass in the late 1880s consisted of Ure and his Native-American wife. Local tradition has it that his wife would camp on the nearby Strawberry Island (which was visible from the open sea) and signal him with a fire on the island's summit to alert him to whether or not it was safe to attempt to bring the human cargo he illegally transported ashore. For transport, Ure would tie the people up in burlap bags so that if customs agents approached he could toss the bagged people overboard. The tidal currents carried the entrapped drowned migrants' bodies to San Juan Island to the north and west of the pass; many ended up in Dead Man's Bay.

Between 1910 and 1914, a prison rock quarry was operated on the Fidalgo Island side of the pass. Nearby barracks housed some 40 prisoners, members of an honors program out of Walla Walla State Penitentiary and the prison population was made up of several types of prisoners, including those convicted of murder. Guards stood watch at the quarry as prisoners cut the rock into gravel and loaded it onto barges at the base of the cliff atop the pass's waters. The quarried rock was then barged to the Seattle waterfront.  The camp was dismantled in 1924 and although abandoned as a quarry, the remains of the camp can still be found. The location is hazardous; over the years there have been several fatal accidents when visitors have ventured onto the steep cliffs.

Upon completion on July 31, 1935, the  span Deception Pass Bridge connected Whidbey Island to the tiny Pass Island, and Pass Island to Fidalgo Island. Prior to the bridge, travelers used an inter-island ferry to commute between Fidalgo and Whidbey islands.

Currents
Deception Pass is a dramatic seascape where the tidal flow and whirlpools beneath the twin bridges connecting Fidalgo Island to Whidbey Island move quickly. This swift current can lead to standing waves, large whirlpools, and roiling eddies. This swift current phenomenon can be viewed from the twin bridges' pedestrian walkways or from the trail leading below the larger south bridge from the parking lot on the Whidbey Island side. Boats can be seen waiting on either side of the pass for the current to stop or change direction before going through. Thrill-seeking kayakers go there during large tide changes to surf the standing waves and brave the class 2 and 3 rapid conditions.

Scuba diving
Diving Deception Pass is dangerous and only for the most competent and prepared divers. There are a few times each year that the tides are right for a drift dive from the cove, under the bridge, and back to the cove as the tide changes. These must be planned well in advance by divers who know how to read currents and are aware of the dangerous conditions. However, because of the large tidal exchange, Deception Pass hosts some of the most spectacular colors and life in the Pacific Northwest. The walls and bottom are covered in colorful invertebrates, lingcod, greenlings, and barnacles everywhere.

State park

Deception Pass is surrounded by  Deception Pass State Park, one of the most visited Washington state parks with over two million annual visitors. 
History
The park was officially established in 1923, when the original  of a military reserve was transferred to Washington State Parks. The park's facilities were greatly enhanced in the 1930s when the Civilian Conservation Corps (CCC) built roads, trails, and buildings in order to develop the park. The road to West Beach was created in 1950, opening up a stretch of beach to hordes of vehicles. The former fish hatchery at Bowman Bay became a part of the park in the early 1970s. The old entrance to the park was closed in 1997 when a new entrance was created at the intersection of Highway 20 and Cornet Bay road, improving access into and out of the park.
Activities and amenities
The park's recreational facilities include campgrounds, hiking trails, beaches, and tidepools. Several miles of the Pacific Northwest Trail are within the park, most notably including the section that crosses Deception Pass on the Highway 20 bridge. In addition, the Cornet Bay Retreat Center provides cabins and dining and recreation facilities. Cornet Bay offers boat launches and fishing opportunities, while Bowman Bay has an interpretive center that explains the story of the Civilian Conservation Corps throughout Washington state. Near the center is a CCC honor statue, which can be found in 30 different states in the country. Fishing is popular in Pass Lake, on the north side of the bridge.  Boat rentals and guided tours of the park are also offered.
Islands
Included in the park are ten islands: Northwest Island, Deception Island, Pass Island, Strawberry, Ben Ure, Kiket, Skagit, Hope, and Big and Little Deadman Islands. Ben Ure Island is partially privately owned.  The island is not open to the public except for a small rentable cabin available via the state park, which is only accessible by rowboat.

In popular culture
Jonathan Raban's 1999 travel memoir Passage to Juneau describes the history of the pass and Raban's passage through it in a 30ft yacht.  The 2002 horror movie The Ring was in part filmed near the pass. The bridge is fictionalized as a toll bridge named "Desolation Bridge" in season one of The Killing. Seattle shoegaze act The Sight Below filmed the 2008 video for their track "Further Away" at Deception Pass, with Deception Island's scenic imagery prominently featured. Seattle grunge band Mudhoney named a song on their 1993 EP Five Dollar Bob's Mock Cooter Stew "Deception Pass." Seattle progressive rock band Queensrÿche filmed scenes of their video "Anybody Listening" near Deception Pass and Deception Island.

See also
 Juan Carrasco (explorer)
 Deception Pass ferry

References

External links

 Deception Pass State Park Washington State Parks and Recreation Commission
 Deception Pass Park Foundation

Straits of Washington (state)
Landforms of Puget Sound
State parks of Washington (state)
Protected areas established in 1922
Parks in Island County, Washington
Parks in Skagit County, Washington
Civilian Conservation Corps in Washington (state)
Bodies of water of Island County, Washington
Bodies of water of Skagit County, Washington